Bovallstrand is a locality situated in Sotenäs Municipality, Västra Götaland County, Sweden with 474 inhabitants on December 31, 2010.

References 

Photos : http://frozentime.se/photos/bovall.html

Populated places in Västra Götaland County
Populated places in Sotenäs Municipality